Heiligensee is a railway station in Heiligensee, a locality in the Reinickendorf borough of Berlin. It is served by the S-Bahn line .

History
With the construction of the Wall on 13 August 1961, the outbound traffic was interrupted and Heiligensee to the terminus on West Berlin territory. After the transfer of the S-Bahn traffic from the Reichsbahn to the Berlin public transport on 9 January 1984, the decommissioning of the Kremmener Bahn took place in Berlin.

Only after the fundamental renewal of the route Berlin Schönholz - Hennigsdorf (the railway embankment had been demolished in part for the construction of the A111), construction began on 20 July 1995. The station was reopened together with the reopened section between Tegel and Hennigsdorf on 15 December 1998.

References

Railway stations in Berlin
Berlin S-Bahn stations
Buildings and structures in Reinickendorf
Railway stations in Germany opened in 1893